Sampa Tshering is a Bhutanese international footballer. He made his official debut in their 2019 AFC Asian Cup qualifying match second leg against Bangladesh, coming on as a substitute in the 57th minute, replacing Dorji

References

Bhutanese footballers
Bhutan international footballers
Living people
Association football forwards
1995 births